Acalyptris platani is a moth of the family Nepticulidae. It is widespread in southern Europe and western Asia, from Portugal to Iran. It has spread westwards from its original occurrence in the Balkans before 1930, and has since been found in western France and Switzerland. It has also been recorded from Menorca, Bulgaria, Cyprus and Turkey.

The wingspan is 5–5.4 mm. Adults are on wing from in May and June and again in July and August. There are probably two generations per year.

The larvae feed on Platanus acerifolia, Platanus orientalis. They mine the leaves of their host plant. The mine consists of a long, winding, full depth corridor. The frass line is green when fresh and turns brown later. It is very variable in width. Pupation takes place outside of the mine.

References

External links 
 Acalyptris Meyrick: revision of the platani and staticis groups in Europe and the Mediterranean (Lepidoptera: Nepticulidae)
 bladmineerders.nl

Nepticulidae
Moths of Europe
Moths of Asia
Moths described in 1934